The 2011 SEC softball tournament was held at the Ole Miss Softball Complex on the campus of the University of Mississippi in Oxford, Mississippi on May 12 through May 14, 2011. The winner of the tournament received the conference's automatic bid to the 2011 NCAA Division I softball tournament. The Tennessee Lady Volunteers were the 2011 SEC softball tournament champions.

Seeds

The seeding for the tournament is as follows:

Tournament
All times are Central Standard Time.

SEC softball tournament
SEC Tournament

External links
2011 SEC softball tournament

References

SEC softball tournament
2011 Southeastern Conference softball season